The 2023 NACAC U23 & U18 Championships, the twelfth edition of the biennial athletics competition between North American, Central American and Caribbean Athletic Association at NACAC U23 Championships in Athletics for athletes under the age of twenty-three and third edition of NACAC U18 Championships in Athletics for athletes under the age of eighteen. The 2023 NACAC U23 & U18 Championships are organized by World Athletics and North America, Central America and Caribbean Athletic Association and scheduled to be held from 21–23 July 2023 in North America.

Results

U23 Men

U23 Track 

* Indicates the athletes only competed in the preliminary heats and received medals.

U23 Field

U23 Combined

U23 Women

U23 Track 

* Indicates the athletes only competed in the preliminary heats and received medals.

U23 Field

U23 Combined

U18 Men

U18 Track 

* Indicates the athletes only competed in the preliminary heats and received medals.

U18 Field

U18 Combined

U18 Women

U18 Track 

* Indicates the athletes only competed in the preliminary heats and received medals.

U18 Field

U18 Combined

Entry standards

Participating nations
According to an unofficial count,  athletes from 31 countries participated.

References

External links
 Athletics – NACAC U-23 & U18 Championships – 2023 – Schedule and results World Athletics
 Athletics – NACAC U-23 & U18 Championships – 2023 PAN AM U20 CHAMPIONSHIPS – Schedule Athletics Canada

2023 U23
2023 U18
2023 U18 & U23
Under-23 athletics competitions
Under-18 athletics competitions
Continental athletics championships
Biennial athletics competitions
NACAC U18 U23 U20 Championships
Scheduled sports events
July 2023 sports events in North America
Athletics in Central America
2020s in North America
2020s in North American sport
2020s in North American women's sport